Yanti Kusmiati (born 22 December 1962) is a former Indonesian badminton player who was active during the 1980s.

Career 
Kusmiati was born in Bogor, West Java. She is the daughter of Esther Tunjung Wulan, Indonesian former badminton player, coach and international referee. She graduated from Ragunan Sports School and joined Prasetya Mulya (PSM) Jakarta.

Kusmiati is a former Indonesian badminton player who specializes in women's doubles paired with Verawaty Fajrin. She and her teammates won the first edition of the World Mixed Team Championship, the 1989 Sudirman Cup in Jakarta and became a member of the Indonesian women's team at the World Women's Team Championship, the Uber Cup in 1986, 1988, and 1990. In the 1986 Uber Cup the Indonesian team won second place. Kusmiati also won the women's doubles at the 1988 Asian Invitational Championships with Verawaty Fadjrin and the Indonesian Open in 1988.

Kusmiati used to be a mixed doubles assistant coach at the Indonesia national team.

Achievements

World Cup 
Women's doubles

Mixed doubles

Southeast Asian Games 
Women's doubles

IBF World Grand Prix 
The World Badminton Grand Prix was sanctioned by the International Badminton Federation from 1983 to 2006.

Women's doubles 

  IBF Grand Prix tournament
  IBF Grand Prix Finals tournament

Invitational Tournament 
Women's doubles

References 

1962 births
Living people
People from Bogor Regency
Sportspeople from West Java
Indonesian female badminton players
Badminton coaches
Southeast Asian Games gold medalists for Indonesia
Southeast Asian Games silver medalists for Indonesia
Southeast Asian Games medalists in badminton
Competitors at the 1989 Southeast Asian Games
21st-century Indonesian women
20th-century Indonesian women